Yanhewan, is a town in Ansai District, Yan'an, Shaanxi, China. According to the 2010 Chinese Census, Yanhewan has a population of 14,499.

History

Dynastic China 
In the early 7th century, during the Tang dynasty, the urban center of Jinming County was located in present-day Diezigou Village in Yanhewan.

During the Song dynasty, Ansai Fort was built in the ancient city of Ansai, located in present-day Yanhewan.

Second United Front 
On September 12, 1937, according to an order from the Shaanxi-Gansu-Ningxia Border Region Government, Ansai County, which governed the region including Yanhewan, was re-organized into 7 districts governing 42 townships. One such district was Yanhewan, which governed six townships, including the eponymous Yanhewan township.

People's Republic of China 
In March 1956, Ansai County's districts were re-organized, and Yanhewan District was abolished, replaced with the directly administered township of Yanhewan.

In September 1958, Yanhewan became a people's commune, and was renamed to Hongqi. In September 1961, Ansai County was re-established, and Yanhewan was placed under its jurisdiction. In December 1983, the people's communes were abolished, and Yanhewan was established as a town.

Administrative divisions 
Yanhewan administers the following 15 administrative villages:

 Yanhewan Village
 Majiagou Village
 Diezigou Village
 Baijiagou Village
 Lijiawan Village
 Fangjiahe Village
 Zhaiziwan Village
 Yanjiawan Village
 Hougoumen Village
 Yunping Village
 Chafang Village
 Liudang Village
 Bianqiang Village
 Jiajiawa Village
 Gaojiamao Village

Demographics 
According to the 2010 Chinese Census, Yanhewan had a population of 14,499 in 2010. This is down slightly from the 15,245 recorded in the 2000 Chinese Census.

As of 2018, Yanhewan has a hukou population of 20,236.

Transportation 
The G65 Baotou–Maoming Expressway passes through Yanhewan, and it forms a junction with the terminus of the Yanwu Expressway in Yanhewan.

References 

Coordinates on Wikidata
Yan'an
Township-level divisions of Shaanxi